The Quaid-e-Azam International Cup was an annual football tournament held in Pakistan. The tournament was established to commemorate the centenary of the birth of Muhammad Ali Jinnah, the first leader of Pakistan, known as Quaid-e-Azam (Great Leader). It was last played in 1987, and a total of five editions were played starting from 1976. The tournament was played with a round robin format in 1976, 1982 and 1986, while the other two editions in 1985 and 1987, were played in a double group format. Both senior national team alongside club teams took part in the tournament.

Results

Stadiums

See also  
Football in Asia
Football in Pakistan

References

Quaid-e-Azam International Cup
Sport in Pakistan
International men's association football invitational tournaments
Defunct international association football competitions in Asia
Recurring sporting events established in 1976
Recurring sporting events disestablished in 1987
Memorials to Muhammad Ali Jinnah